The 1999 Holy Cross Crusaders football team was an American football team that represented the College of the Holy Cross during the 1999 NCAA Division I-AA football season. Holy Cross tied for second-to-last in the Patriot League.

In their fourth year under head coach Dan Allen, the Crusaders compiled a 3–8 record. John Aloisi, David Puloka and Joe Saunders were the team captains.

The Crusaders were outscored 323 to 219. Holy Cross' 2–4 conference record tied for fifth in the seven-team Patriot League standings. 

Holy Cross played its home games at Fitton Field on the college campus in Worcester, Massachusetts.

Schedule

Roster

References

Holy Cross
Holy Cross Crusaders football seasons
Holy Cross Crusaders football